Christine de Marquetiere Goutiere Weston (31 August 1903  – 4 May 1989) was an India-born American fiction writer.

Life

She was born in Unnao, now in Uttar Pradesh, British India, the daughter of George Henry Goutière, a British indigo planter of French descent, and Alice Luard Wintle, also born in British India.  In 1923 she married American businessman Robert Weston, and moved with him to the United States, where she began a writing career.

Weston's second novel, The Devil's Foot (1942), was described by Dawn Powell as handling "an American story with the dexterity and subtlety of Henry James." Indigo (1943), set in India, is generally considered her best work and made her reputation as a psychological novelist. The Dark Wood (1946) also received good reviews and the rights were bought by Twentieth-Century Fox.  The film was cast in 1946 with Maureen O'Hara and Tyrone Power in the lead roles, and Otto Preminger directing, but was never produced.

Weston also wrote The World is a Bridge (1950) and two non-fiction books about Ceylon and Afghanistan.  In total she produced 10 novels, over 30 short stories (mostly for New York City magazines), 2 non-fiction books, and Bhimsa, the Dancing Bear (1945), a 1946 Newbery Honor children's book.

Weston divorced her husband in 1951 but later remarried. At the time of the divorce they were living in Castine, Maine, and she wrote some of her later fiction about New England.  She spent the later part of her life in Bangor, Maine.

Weston won a Guggenheim Fellowship in 1940.

References

Obituary, New York Times, May 6, 1989
"Woman Novelist Gets Divorce", New York Times, Oct. 24, 1951
Review of "Indigo", New York Times, Oct. 24, 1943

External links
 Christine Weston at Library of Congress Authorities — with 13 catalog records

1903 births
1989 deaths
Writers from Bangor, Maine
American women novelists
Newbery Honor winners
20th-century British novelists
20th-century American women writers
20th-century American novelists
People from Unnao
People from Castine, Maine
Novelists from Maine